Grantham House is a town house, built in 1380, which is owned by the National Trust. It is in Grantham, Lincolnshire, England.

The House is in Castlegate and its architectural features have been enhanced and remodelled  several times over the centuries and include a 16th-century chimney stack, 17th century windows and an 18th-century staircase. The House and the Stables are both Grade I listed buildings and the Wall and Doorway for the riverside garden is Grade II* listed. It was known as 'Hall House' in the 16th century after the Hall family who owned it and important guests during this period include Cardinal Wolsey and Margaret Tudor, Queen of Scots.

The house is a tenanted property and is not open to visitors.

References

External links
National Trust - Grantham House
You tube video

Grade I listed buildings in Lincolnshire
National Trust properties in Lincolnshire
Historic house museums in Lincolnshire
Buildings and structures in Grantham
Grade I listed houses
Grade II* listed buildings in Lincolnshire